Dynamite Daze is a studio album by the rock artist Kevin Coyne, released in 1978 by Virgin Records.

Track listing
All tracks composed by Coyne unless otherwise indicated:

Side One
 "Dynamite Daze" – 2:44
 "Brothers Of Mine" – 4:07	
 "Lunatic" – 4.52 (Tim Rice on piano)
 "Are We Dreaming" – 3:39 (Paul Wickens on accordion, also composed)
 "(Take Me Back To) Dear Old Blighty" – 1:27 (Zoot Money on piano; composed by A. J. Mills, Bennett Scott, F. Godfrey)
 "I Really Live Round Here (False Friends)" – 3:56 (drums and synthesizer by Paul Wickens)
 "I Am" – 2:21 (lyrics by Eric Robinson)

Side Two
 "Amsterdam" – 3:00
 "I Only Want To See You Smile" – 2:31 (Tim Rice on piano)
 "Juliet And Mark" – 4:46
 "Woman, Woman, Woman" – 4:06	
 "Cry" – 5:36 (composed by Churchill Kohlman; Zoot Money on electric piano)
 "Dance Of Bourgeoisie" – 2:00 (composed by Coyne and George Money; Zoot Money on electric piano)

Personnel

Musicians
 Kevin Coyne – acoustic guitar and vocals
 Bob Ward – acoustic and electric guitar
 Paul Wickens – drums, congas, minimoog, accordion
 Zoot Money – piano, Fender Rhodes
 Vic Sweeney – drums
 Al James – bass

Technical
 Producers – Kevin Coyne and Bob Ward
 Engineers – Vic Sweeney and Al James 
 Executive Producer – Steve Lewis
 Cover photography – Murray Close
 Cover artwork – Peter Knipe

Recorded at: Alvic Studios, Wimbledon.

References

External links 
  from TopPop, broadcast 2 January 1978 (Kevin Coyne and Bob Ward)

1978 albums
Kevin Coyne albums
Virgin Records albums